The 2008 season was Molde's 32nd season in the top flight of Norwegian football. They competed in Tippeligaen where they finished in 9th position and the Norwegian Cup where they were knocked out by Stabæk in the semi-finals.

Squad

Transfers

Winter

In:

 

Out:

Summer

In:

Out:

Competitions

Tippeligaen

Results summary

Results by round

Fixtures

League table

Norwegian Cup

Squad statistics

Appearances and goals

|-
|colspan="14"|Players away from Molde on loan:

|-
|colspan="14"|Players who appeared for Molde no longer at the club:
|}

Goal Scorers

Disciplinary record

See also
Molde FK seasons

References 

2008
Molde